Zack Pianalto (born May 27, 1989) is a former American football tight end who played most recently for the Carolina Panthers of the National Football League (NFL). He was signed by the Buffalo Bills as an undrafted free agent in 2011. He played with the Tampa Bay Buccaneers in 2011 and 2012. He was a member of the Pittsburgh Steelers for part of the 2013 offseason. He played college football for the University of North Carolina at Chapel Hill.

Professional career
Pianalto was an undrafted player out of University of North Carolina at Chapel Hill and was signed onto the Buffalo Bills 90-man roster and made the initial 53-man roster before being cut a day later. On September 5, 2011, Pianalto was claimed by the Tampa Bay Buccaneers, given jersey number 80, and was the third tight end on the depth chart. After a decent 2011 season he did not play in 2012 and was cut following the regular season. Soon after, he was signed to the Pittsburgh Steelers Reserve/Future squad along with kicker Daniel Hrapmann. He was released from the team in June 2013.

On July 30, 2013, Pianalto was signed by the Carolina Panthers.
He was released from the team August 2013.

References

External links
Buffalo Bills bio
North Carolina Tar Heels bio
Carolina Panthers bio
Tampa Bay Buccaneers bio

1989 births
Living people
People from Springdale, Arkansas
Players of American football from Arkansas
American football tight ends
North Carolina Tar Heels football players
Buffalo Bills players
Tampa Bay Buccaneers players
Pittsburgh Steelers players
Carolina Panthers players